Anaclastis is a genus of moths of the family Crambidae. It contains only one species, Anaclastis apicistrigellus, which is found in Australia, where it has been recorded from Queensland and New South Wales.

References

Crambinae
Taxa named by Alfred Jefferis Turner
Monotypic moth genera
Moths of Australia
Crambidae genera